Abdessalam Ameknassi is a Moroccan karateka. He won one of the bronze medals in the men's kumite 60 kg event at the 2018 World Karate Championships held in Madrid, Spain.

At the 2018 Mediterranean Games held in Tarragona, Spain, he won the gold medal in the men's kumite 60 kg event.

He won the gold medal in his event at the 2019 African Karate Championships held in Gaborone, Botswana. He also won one of the bronze medals in the men's team kumite event. He represented Morocco at the 2019 African Games held in Rabat, Morocco and he won the silver medal in the men's kumite 60 kg event. He also won the silver medal in the men's team kumite event.

Achievements

References 

Living people
Year of birth missing (living people)
Place of birth missing (living people)
Moroccan male karateka
Competitors at the 2018 Mediterranean Games
Mediterranean Games gold medalists for Morocco
Mediterranean Games medalists in karate
Competitors at the 2019 African Games
African Games medalists in karate
African Games silver medalists for Morocco
21st-century Moroccan people